"You Be Killin Em" is a song by American rapper Fabolous, released as the first single from his debut extended play There Is No Competition 2: The Grieving Music EP (2010). Recorded at Tainted Blue Studio, NYC, the song was produced by American musician Ryan Leslie, with an unknown extent of involvement from American rapper Kid Cudi. The song was released to radio on November 23, 2010.

Music video 
The music video was filmed in November 2010; directed by Aristotle (By Any Means LLC).  Model Amber Rose makes an appearance in the video as well as Ryan Leslie. The video was shot in black-and-white. The video shows with a gunshot view of a woman surrounding two black men.

Remix 
The song was officially remixed, titled "Look at Her (Killin 'Em Pt. 2)". The remix features a new verse from Fabolous, as well as new vocals from American singers Ne-Yo and Ryan Leslie, the latter of whom also contributed new production to the song. The remix is listed as the fourteenth and final track of Fabolous's fifth mixtape The S.O.U.L. Tape (2011).

Charts

Weekly charts

Year-end charts

Certifications

Release history

References 

2010 singles
2010 songs
Fabolous songs
Def Jam Recordings singles
Song recordings produced by Ryan Leslie
Songs written by Ryan Leslie
Songs written by Fabolous
Songs written by Kid Cudi
Song recordings produced by Kid Cudi